Water polo competitions at the 2022 South American Games in Asuncion, Paraguay were held from 11 to 15 October 2022 at the Centro Acuático Nacional cluster.

Two medal events were scheduled to be contested: a men's and women's tournament. A total of 168 athletes (78 athletes–6 teams for men and 91 athletes–7 teams for women) competed in the events.  Both tournaments were open competitions without age restrictions.

The gold and silver medalists teams in each tournament qualified for the 2023 Pan American Games water polo competitions, plus Chile which qualified automatically as the 2023 Pan American Games hosts.

Argentina and Brazil were the defending champions of the South American Games men's and women's water polo events. Argentina had won the men's tournament in the last edition in Cochabamba 2018 while Brazil had won the women's tournament in the Medellín 2010 edition (women's event was not held in Santiago 2014 nor Cochabamba 2018).

Brazil won the gold medal in both men's and women's events.

Participating nations
A total of 8 ODESUR nations registered teams for the water polo events. Each nation was able to enter a maximum of 26 athletes (one team of 13 players per gender). Argentina, Brazil, Chile, Colombia and hosts Paraguay participated in both men's and women's tournament. Uruguay participated in the men's tournament, while Peru and Venezuela participated in the women's tournament.

Medal summary

Medal table

Medalists

Men's tournament

Preliminary round

Knockout stage

Final standings

Women's tournament

Group stage

Group A

Group B

Knockout stage

Final standings

References

External links
 ASU2022 Water polo at ASU2022 official website.
 ASU2022 Water polo Teams Male.
 ASU2022 Water polo Teams Female.

Water polo
South American Games
2022
Qualification tournaments for the 2023 Pan American Games
Water polo at the 2022 South American Games